This page covers all relevant details regarding PFC Cherno More Varna for all official competitions inside the 2011–12 season. These are A PFG and Bulgarian Cup.

Transfers

In

Out

Loans in

Loans out

Squad information

Competitions

Pre-season and Friendlies

A PFG

League table

Results summary

League performance

Bulgarian Cup

Squad statistics 

|-
|align=left|||align=left|||align=left|  
|12||0||0||0||12||0||1||0||
|-
|align=left|||align=left|||align=left|  
|||0||0||0||style="background:#98FB98"|||0||1||0||
|-
|align=left|||align=left|||align=left|  
|28||2||1||0||29||2||8||0||
|-
|align=left|||align=left|||align=left|  †
|||0||0||0||||0||0||0||
|-
|align=left|||align=left|||align=left|  
|||0||0||0||style="background:#98FB98"|||0||0||0||
|-
|align=left|||align=left|||align=left|  
|25||2||0||0||26||2||6||0||
|-
|align=left|||align=left|FW||align=left|  
|||4||1||0||style="background:#98FB98"|||4||1||0||
|-
|align=left|10||align=left|FW||align=left|  
|||7||0||0||||7||8||0||
|-
|align=left|11||align=left|||align=left|  †
|||0||0||0||||0||1||0||
|-
|align=left|11||align=left|FW||align=left|  
|||1||0||0||style="background:#98FB98"|||1||0||0||
|-
|align=left|12||align=left|||align=left|  
|0||0||0||0||0||0||0||0||
|-
|align=left|14||align=left|FW||align=left|  
|27||3||1||0||28||3||3||0||
|-
|align=left|15||align=left|||align=left|  
|29||1||1||0||30||1||1||1||
|-
|align=left|16||align=left|||align=left|  †
|||1||0||0||||1||1||0||
|-
|align=left|17||align=left|||align=left|  
|||0||||0||||0||2||1||
|-
|align=left|18||align=left|||align=left|  
|25||0||1||0||style="background:#98FB98"|26||0||7||0||
|-
|align=left|19||align=left|||align=left|  
|||1||0||0||style="background:#98FB98"|||1||3||0||
|-
|align=left|20||align=left|||align=left|  
|||0||0||0||||0||0||0||
|-
|align=left|21||align=left|||align=left|  (c)
|||10||1||0||||10||6||0||
|-
|align=left|22||align=left|||align=left|  
|||0||0||0||style="background:#98FB98"|||0||0||0||
|-
|align=left|23||align=left|||align=left|  
|||0||1||0||style="background:#98FB98"|||0||1||0||
|-
|align=left|24||align=left|||align=left|  †
|||0||1||0||style="background:#98FB98"|||0||1||0||
|-
|align=left|24||align=left|||align=left|  
|||1||0||0||style="background:#98FB98"|||0||0||0||
|-
|align=left|25||align=left|||align=left|  
|25||1||1||0||26||1||11||2||
|-
|align=left|26||align=left|||align=left|  †
|15||0||1||0||16||0||1||0||
|-
|align=left|27||align=left|||align=left|  †
|||0||0||0||||0||0||0||
|-
|align=left|30||align=left|FW||align=left|  
|||4||0||0||||4||1||0||
|-
|align=left|33||align=left|||align=left|  
|||0||0||0||style="background:#98FB98"|||0||0||0||
|-
|align=left|55||align=left|||align=left|  
|21||1||1||0||22||1||8||2||
|-
|align=left|77||align=left|||align=left| 
|||0||0||0||||0||0||0||
|-
|align=left|86||align=left|||style="background:#faecc8; text-align:left;"|  ‡
|10||1||0||0||style="background:#98FB98"|10||1||0||0||
|-
|align=left|90||align=left|FW||align=left|  
|||4||||0||||4||1||0||
|-
|align=left|91||align=left|||align=left|  
|||1||0||0||style="background:#98FB98"|||1||1||0||
|-
|}

Start formations
Accounts for all competitions. Numbers constitute according game of the competition in which the formation was used, NOT number of occurrences.

Club
Coaching staff
{|class="wikitable"
!Position
!Staff
|-
|Manager|| Stefan Genov
|-
|Assistant First Team Coach|| Emanuil Lukanov
|-
|Goalkeeper Coach|| Krasimir Kolev
|-
|First Team Fitness Coach|| Veselin Markov
|-
|Individual Team Fitness Coach|| Viktor Bumbalov
|-
|Medical Director|| Dr. Petko Atev
|-
|Academy Manager|| Hristina Dimitrova
|-Other information

References

PFC Cherno More Varna seasons
Cherno More Varna